Dax David Riggs (born October 15, 1973) is an American musician, best known for fronting the sludge metal band Acid Bath in the 1990s. He has been a part of many projects since then, including Agents of Oblivion and Deadboy & the Elephantmen. In 2007 he began releasing material under his own name.

Bands

Corruption
Corruption was Riggs in his teens fronting a thrash metal band that played cover songs, though they never played a real gig.

Golgotha
Golgotha was the sludge/thrash metal foundation of what would later become Acid Bath. The band released one demo, Wet Dreams of the Insane (1991), under that name before changing it. It featured Riggs as the lead vocalist, Mike Sanchez and Jerry "Boon" Businelli on guitar, Jimmy Kyle on drums, and Chad Pierce on bass.

Acid Bath
Acid Bath was a seminal sludge metal band from southern Louisiana. The band was marked by an unusual blend of sludge metal, swamp blues, doom metal, hardcore punk and psychedelia. Singer Dax Riggs's voice could range from a guttural growl to a Roy Orbison-esque wail in mid-song. In the liner notes for their second album, Paegan Terrorism Tactics, the band thanked the ghost of Roy Orbison (as well as David Bowie) for his help in creating their sound. The band was also noted for Riggs's imaginative and distinctive lyrics which often featured themes of death and drugs.

Daisyhead & The Mooncrickets
Daisyhead & The Mooncrickets was a project of Riggs between 1995 and 1997 that never took off. Only two Daisyhead recordings are known to exist: Skeletal Circus Derails, a six-song recording from 1995, and a self-titled 14-track album from 1997, where most of the songs are cut off before they end.

They also detail a point in Riggs' career when he struggled for life after Acid Bath, which disbanded following the death of bassist Audie Pitre in 1997.

Toward the end of Daisyhead & The Mooncrickets, Riggs was pushing for a more melodic sound, which materializes in his subsequent bands Agents of Oblivion and Deadboy & the Elephantmen. That sound was first heard on the Daisyhead recordings.

Agents of Oblivion

Agents of Oblivion was the first of Riggs's post-Acid Bath projects to release any official recordings. The band first emerged with a five-song demo, featuring former Acid Bath guitarist Mike Sanchez on lead guitar. The demo included "Big Black Backwards", "Ash of the Mind", and other songs which would later appear on the band's 2000 self-titled debut. The album included the five demo songs in addition to "Riding the Wormhole", a new version of "The Skeletal Circus Derails", and a newer, faster version of Acid Bath's "Dead Girl". The album features a blend of spare, dark ballads interspersed with blues-based heavy metal, although the sound never reverts to the more aggressive stylings of Acid Bath. The band broke up after a short tour in support of the album.

Deadboy & the Elephantmen
Deadboy & the Elephantmen was Riggs's next band,  active from 2000 until 2007. Initially a solo project, it later morphed into a full band before eventually settling on a two-piece lineup of Riggs and drummer Tessie Brunet. The band toured on many festivals with various bands, including Fiery Furnaces, Peaches, Eagles of Death Metal, Wolfmother and Heartless Bastards, and released albums on Fat Possum Records.

T-Daks & His White Plastic Soul and Dax Riggs

Riggs's solo project started out under the name T-Daks & His White Plastic Soul. Riggs performed a handful of live shows under that name, mostly performing acoustic. After the breakup of Deadboy & The Elephantmen in early 2007, he stated that he would release future albums under his own name. His first solo album, We Sing of Only Blood or Love, was released on Fat Possum Records in August 2007. His second album, Say Goodnight to the World, was released on August 3, 2010 (also with Fat Possum Records).

Discography

with Acid Bath
 When the Kite String Pops (1994)
 Paegan Terrorism Tactics (1996)

with Agents of Oblivion
 Agents of Oblivion (2000)

with Deadboy & the Elephantmen
If This Is Hell, Then I'm Lucky (2002; rereleased in 2008 as a solo Dax Riggs album)
 Song Mechanism EP (2004)
 We Are Night Sky (2005)

Solo
 We Sing of Only Blood or Love (2007)
 Say Goodnight to the World (2010)

See also
 Dax Riggs albums
 Agents of Oblivion (self-titled 2000)

References

External links

 Official website
 Official Dax Riggs poetry
 Dax Riggs and Sammy Duet interview

Living people
1973 births
American heavy metal musicians
American male singer-songwriters
American rock songwriters
American rock singers
Singer-songwriters from Louisiana
People from Houma, Louisiana
Fat Possum Records artists
21st-century American singers
21st-century American male singers